Thomas Wright (12 April 1839 – 19 February 1909) was an English social commentator.

He was the son of a blacksmith who became a tramping worker, before finding employment as a mutual labourer in an engineering firm. He studied on his own, and in 1872 became one of the first national school-board visitors. He wrote widely on the world of the working man into which he had been born.

Wright's essays on social commentary were published in three volumes, Some Habits and Customs of the Working Classes (1867), The Great Unwashed (1868), and Our New Masters (1873).

Notes

Further reading
A. J. Reid, ‘Intelligent artisans and aristocrats of labour: the essays of Thomas Wright’, in J. Winter (ed.), The Working Class in Modern British History: Essays in Honour of Henry Pelling (Cambridge University Press, 1983), pp. 171–86.

1839 births
1909 deaths
British social reformers